CityFM89 is a Pakistani radio station, headquartered in Karachi and broadcast from Karachi, Lahore, Islamabad and Faisalabad. It was established in July 2004 and is a subsidiary company of the Dawn Media Group. It had an objective to set a trend of radio listenership in Pakistan at a time where tapes and CDs were the usual source of music entertainment in cars, homes and public outlets.

Shows 
As of January 1, 2022, the following shows are aired on the radio station:

 The Breakfast Show with Anoushey Ashraf - 08:00 AM - 11:00 AM (Monday to Friday)
 Midday Madness - 12:00 PM - 03:00 PM (Monday to Thursday) / 12:00 PM - 2:00 PM (Friday)
 89 Jukebox - 03:00 PM - 04:00 PM (Monday to Friday)
 Rush Hour with Wes Malik - 05:00 PM - 08:00 PM (Monday to Friday except Wednesday) / 05:00 PM - 07:00 PM Wednesday)
 Route 89 - 08:00 PM - 10:00 PM (Monday to Friday except Wednesday) / 09:00 PM - 10:00 PM Wednesday)
 The Darkroom with Tapu Javeri- 07:00 PM – 09:00 PM (Wednesday)
 Sufi Hour - 02:00 PM – 03:00 PM (Friday)
 BeatCamp - 10:00 PM – 12:00 AM (Friday) / 10:00 PM – 11:00 AM (Saturday) 
 Full Disclosure - Saba – 05:00 PM – 07:00 PM (Saturday and Sunday)
 Retro89 - 07:00 PM – 09:00 PM (Sunday)

References

External links
Official site

Contemporary hit radio stations
Mass media in Karachi
Radio stations in Pakistan
Dawn Media Group